Gary Hall, also known as Shequida Hall or mononymously as Shequida, is a classically trained opera singer, songwriter, playwright, and drag artist, born in Jamaica.

He attended Juilliard, where he studied with noted bass-baritone Simon Estes.

As the female character Shequida, he has been the USA Network's spokesperson for Latin America.  From 1997 to 1998 he played Wendi Mercury on the daytime television show One Life to Live.  He starred in Daron Hagen's Vera of Las Vegas for its world premier in 2003.

His off-Broadway show, Opera for Dummies, garnered a positive review in The Boston Phoenix, and was nominated for a GLAAD Media Award.

In 2008, Shequida appeared on the TV reality competition America's Got Talent, getting into the Top 40 for the third season, but was eliminated, later saying in an interview that the experience "was very weird."

Shequida headlined in summer shows in Cherry Grove on Long Island in 2013 and 2014.

See also
 LGBT culture in New York City
 List of LGBT people from New York City

References

External links
 
 Official website

American dance musicians
American male pop singers
America's Got Talent contestants
African-American drag queens
American gay musicians
LGBT African Americans
Jamaican LGBT people
Living people
Nightlife in New York City
Singers from New York City
Year of birth missing (living people)
21st-century LGBT people